The following are operators of the de Havilland Mosquito:

Military operators

Australia
Royal Australian Air Force
No. 1 Squadron RAAF
No. 87 Squadron RAAF
No. 94 Squadron RAAF
No. 456 Squadron RAAF
No. 464 Squadron RAAF
No. 1 Photo Reconnaissance Unit RAAF
No. 5 Operational Training Unit RAAF

Belgium
Belgian Air Force 11 Squadron, 1 Wing

Canada
Royal Canadian Air Force
No. 400 Squadron RCAF
No. 404 Squadron RCAF
No. 406 Squadron RCAF
No. 409 Squadron RCAF
No. 410 Squadron RCAF
No. 418 Squadron RCAF

China
Republic of China Air Force
1st BG RoCAF flew 200 Canadian built Mosquitos 1948–1949

People's Republic of China
People's Liberation Army Air Force
Five ex-Nationalist Mosquitos operated by PLAAF in all version.
Took part in the flight demonstration of the foundation celebration of People's Republic of China on October 1, 1949.

Czechoslovakia
Czechoslovak Air Force

Dominican Republic
Dominican Air Force

France
French Air Force

Haiti
Haitian Air Force

Israel
Israeli Air Force

New Zealand
Royal New Zealand Air Force
14 Squadron (replacing Vought Corsairs 1948–1952)
75 Squadron (replacing Avro Lincolns 1945–1951)
487 Squadron (replacing Lockheed Venturas 1943–1945)
488 Squadron (replacing Bristol Beaufighters 1943–1945)
489 Squadron (replacing Bristol Beaufighters 1945)

Norway
Royal Norwegian Navy Air Service
Royal Norwegian Air Force
333 Squadron
334 Squadron

Poland

Polish Air Forces on exile in Great Britain
No. 305 Polish Bomber Squadron, "Ziemi Wielkopolskiej im. Marszałka Józefa Piłsudskiego"
No. 307 Polish Night Fighter Squadron, "Lwowskich Puchaczy"

South Africa
South African Air Force
No 60 Squadron (PR) SAAF, (North Africa, San Severo (Italy), Bloemfontein (South Africa): February 1943 – June 1947)

Soviet Union
Soviet Air Force

Sweden
Royal Swedish Air Force
Västmanland Wing (F 1)

Switzerland
Swiss Air Force

Turkey
Turkish Air Force

United Kingdom
Royal Air Force

No. 4 Squadron RAF
No. 8 Squadron RAF
No. 11 Squadron RAF
No. 13 Squadron RAF
No. 14 Squadron RAF
No. 16 Squadron RAF
No. 18 Squadron RAF
No. 21 Squadron RAF
No. 22 Squadron RAF
No. 23 Squadron RAF
No. 25 Squadron RAF
No. 27 Squadron RAF
No. 29 Squadron RAF
No. 36 Squadron RAF
No. 39 Squadron RAF
No. 45 Squadron RAF
No. 46 Squadron RAF
No. 47 Squadron RAF
No. 55 Squadron RAF
No. 58 Squadron RAF
No. 68 Squadron RAF
No. 69 Squadron RAF
No. 81 Squadron RAF
No. 82 Squadron RAF
No. 84 Squadron RAF
No. 85 Squadron RAF
No. 89 Squadron RAF
No. 96 Squadron RAF
No. 98 Squadron RAF
No. 105 Squadron RAF
No. 107 Squadron RAF
No. 108 Squadron RAF
No. 109 Squadron RAF
No. 110 Squadron RAF
No. 114 Squadron RAF
No. 125 Squadron RAF
No. 128 Squadron RAF
No. 139 Squadron RAF
No. 140 Squadron RAF
No. 141 Squadron RAF
No. 142 Squadron RAF
No. 143 Squadron RAF
No. 151 Squadron RAF
No. 157 Squadron RAF
No. 162 Squadron RAF
No. 163 Squadron RAF
No. 169 Squadron RAF
No. 176 Squadron RAF
No. 180 Squadron RAF
No. 192 Squadron RAF
No. 199 Squadron RAF
No. 211 Squadron RAF
No. 219 Squadron RAF
No. 235 Squadron RAF
No. 239 Squadron RAF
No. 248 Squadron RAF
No. 249 Squadron RAF
No. 254 Squadron RAF
No. 255 Squadron RAF
No. 256 Squadron RAF
No. 264 Squadron RAF
No. 268 Squadron RAF
No. 333 Squadron RAF
No. 334 Squadron RAF
No. 500 Squadron RAF
No. 502 Squadron RAF
No. 504 Squadron RAF
No. 515 Squadron RAF
No. 521 Squadron RAF
No. 527 Squadron RAF
No. 540 Squadron RAF
No. 544 Squadron RAF
No. 571 Squadron RAF
No. 600 Squadron RAF
No. 604 Squadron RAF
No. 605 Squadron RAF
No. 608 Squadron RAF
No. 609 Squadron RAF
No. 613 Squadron RAF
No. 614 Squadron RAF
No. 616 Squadron RAF
No. 617 Squadron RAF
No. 618 Squadron RAF
No. 627 Squadron RAF
No. 680 Squadron RAF
No. 681 Squadron RAF
No. 683 Squadron RAF
No. 684 Squadron RAF
No. 692 Squadron RAF

Royal Navy Fleet Air Arm
703 Naval Air Squadron VI, T.R.33, T.T.39, T.R.37
704 Naval Air Squadron VI, T.3, B.25
728 Naval Air Squadron T.3, T.T.39, B.25
733 Naval Air Squadron B.25
739 Naval Air Squadron T.R.33
751 Naval Air Squadron VI, T.R.33
762 Naval Air Squadron VI, T.3, T.R.33,  B.25
770 Naval Air Squadron B.25
771 Naval Air Squadron T.R.33, T.T.39, T.R37, B.25
772 Naval Air Squadron B.25
773 Naval Air Squadron VI
777 Naval Air Squadron B.25
778 Naval Air Squadron VI, T.R.33, B.25
780 Naval Air Squadron VI, T.3
787 Naval Air Squadron VI
790 Naval Air Squadron VI, T.R.33, B.25
797 Naval Air Squadron B.25
811 Naval Air Squadron VI, T.3

United States

United States Army Air Forces
 416th Night Fighter Squadron
 425th Night Fighter Squadron
25th Bombardment Group
653rd Bomb Squadron
654th Bomb Squadron
492nd Bombardment Group
 802nd Reconnaissance Group
 8th Reconnaissance Squadron Special
 8th Weather Reconnaissance Squadron

Venezuela
Venezuelan Air Force

Yugoslavia
SFR Yugoslav Air Force
103rd Reconnaissance Aviation Regiment (1951–1956)
88th Bomber Aviation Regiment (1952–1957)
16th Reconnaissance Squadron of Anti-Aircraft Artillery (1958–1962)

Civil operators

Canada

Spartan Air Services

Mexico
Coculum Aeronautica SA de CV

Switzerland
Swissair briefly operated a single interned reconnaissance Mosquito in 1944, but the aircraft was handed back to the Swiss Air Force, who used it as a test bed in 1945.

Turkey
General Command of Mapping (Turkey)

United Kingdom
BOAC

See also

De Havilland Mosquito

References

Notes

Bibliography

 Birtles, Philip. Mosquito; A Pictorial History of the DH98. London: Jane's Publishing Company Ltd., 1980. .
 Bishop, Edward. The Wooden Wonder. Shrewsbury, UK: Airlife Publishing Ltd., 3rd edition 1995. .
 Bowman, Martin. Mosquito Bomber/Fighter-bomber Units 1942–45. Oxford, UK: Osprey Publishing, 1997. .
 Bowman, Martin. Mosquito Fighter/Fighter-bomber Units of World War 2. Oxford, UK: Osprey Publishing, 1998. .
 Bowman, Martin. Mosquito Photo-Reconnaissance Units of World War 2. Oxford, UK: Osprey Publishing, 1999. .
 Bowyer, Chaz. Mosquito at War. Shepperton, Surrey, UK: Ian Allan Ltd., 4th impression 1979. .
 Bowyer, Chaz. Mosquito Squadrons of the Royal Air Force. London: Ian Allan Ltd., 1984. .
 Bowyer, Michael J.F.; Philpott, Bryan and Howe, Stuart. Mosquito (Classic Aircraft No. 7: Their history and how to model them). Cambridge, UK: Patrick Stephens Ltd., 1980. .
 Bridgman, Leonard, ed. "The D.H.98 Mosquito." Jane’s Fighting Aircraft of World War II. London: Studio, 1946. .
 Forslund, Mikael. J 30 – De Havilland Mosquito NF Mk XIX (in Swedish). Stockholm, Sweden: Allt om Hobby, 1997. .
 Freeman, Roger A. "British Aircraft in USAAF Service, 1942–1945" Camouflage & Markings No. 21. London: Ducimus Books, 1973.
 Hardy, M.J. The de Havilland Mosquito. Devon, UK/New York: David & Charles (Publishers) Ltd./Arco Publishing, 1977. , (David & Charles) . (Arco)
 Holliday, Joe. Mosquito! The Wooden Wonder Aircraft of World War II. Toronto: Doubleday, 1970. .
 Hotson, Fred. The De Havilland Canada Story. Toronto: CANAV Books, 1983. .
 Howe, Stuart. Mosquito Portfolio. London: Ian Allan Ltd., 1984. .
 Jackson, A.J. British Civil Aircraft since 1919: Volume 2. London:Putnam, 1973..
 Jackson, Robert. Combat Legend; de Havilland Mosquito. Shrewsbury, UK: Airlife Publishing Ltd., 2003. .
 Jones, R.C. De Havilland Mosquito: RAF Northern Europe 1936–45. London: Ducimus Books Ltd., 1970.
 Malayney, Norman, The 25th Bomb Group (Rcn) History in WWII, Schiffer Publishers Ltd. 2011. .
 Mason, Francis K. and Ward, Richard. De Havilland Mosquito in RAF-FAA-RAAF-SAAF-RNZAF-RCAF-USAAF-French & Foreign Service. Canterbury, Kent, UK: Osprey Publishing Ltd., 1972. .
 McKee, Alexander. The Mosquito Log. London: Souvenir Press Ltd., 1988. .
 Mason, Francis K. and Richard Ward. De Havilland Mosquito in RAF-FAA-RAAF-SAAF-RNZAF-RCAF-USAAF-French & Foreign Service. Canterbury, Kent, UK: Osprey Publishing Ltd., 1972. .
 Scutts, Jerry. Mosquito in Action, Part 1. Carrollton, Texas: Squadron/Signal Publications Inc., 1993. .
 Scutts, Jerry. Mosquito in Action, Part 2. Carrollton, Texas: Squadron/Signal Publications Inc., 1993. .
 Shacklady, Edward. De Havilland Mosquito (Classic WWII Aviation, Volume 6). Bristol, UK: Cerberus Publishing Ltd., 2003. .
 Sharp, C. Martin and Michael J.F. Bowyer. Mosquito. London: Faber & Faber, 1971. .
 Second revised and updated edition published 1995 by Crécy Publishing, .
 
 Thirsk, Ian.de Havilland Mosquito: An Illustrated History Volume 2. Manchester: Crécy Publishing, 2006. .

De Havilland Mosquito
Mosquito
Operators